Filippo Brunelleschi (1377-1446) was one of the foremost architects and engineers of the Italian Renaissance.

Brunelleschi may also refer to:
6055 Brunelleschi (2158 T-3), a Main-belt Asteroid discovered in 1977
 Brunelleschi (crater), a crater on Mercury named for the architect

Other people with the surname
Umberto Brunelleschi (1879-1949), an Italian artist

See also
Brunelleschi's Dome, part of the Florence Cathedral
Brunello (disambiguation)

Italian-language surnames